There are two islands known as Bois Blanc in North America:

Bois Blanc Island (Michigan) located near Mackinac Island
Bois Blanc Island (Ontario), commonly called Boblo Island, had an amusement park until 1993.